Tromsøysund is a former municipality in Troms county in Norway.  The  municipality existed from 1838 until its dissolution in 1964.  The municipality encompassed most of what is now Tromsø Municipality including areas on the island of Kvaløya and on the mainland.  It completely surrounded the city of Tromsø, both on a number of islands as well as on the mainland.  The municipality included the villages of Bjerkaker, Tromsdalen, and Movik. The administrative centre was the village of Tromsdalen, just across the strait from the city of Tromsø.

History
The large prestegjeld of Tromsøe existed for hundreds of years.  In 1838, the new formannskapsdistrikt law established municipal self-government in Norway.  According to the law, each prestegjeld became a municipality, but all cities in Norway had to be separated from their prestegjeld and be their own municipalities.  So, on 1 January 1838, the city of Tromsøe became a municipality and the large surrounding district became the municipality of Tromsøe landdistrikt. Initially, the new municipality had a population of 4,286.

In 1860, the southern part of the municipality (population: 3,610) was split off from Tromsøe landdistrikt to become the new Balsfjord Municipality.  This left Tromsøe landdistrikt with 2,632 inhabitants.  In November 1860, the name of the municipality was changed to Tromsøsundet (the spelling was changed to the more modern spelling Tromsøysund later).  On 1 January 1861, an area of Tromsøysund (population: 110) was transferred to the city of Tromsø.  On 1 January 1873, a part of the neighboring municipality of Malangen (population: 287) was merged back into Tromsøysund (this area in Malangen was separated from Balsfjord in 1871).  This area included the Bakkejord-Kvalnes-Lauksletta-Mjelde area in southern Kvaløya and Brokskar-Bentsjorda area on the mainland. At the same time, an uninhabited part of Tromsøysund was also transferred to Tromsø.  On 1 July 1915, another part of Tromsøysund (population: 512) was transferred to the city of Tromsø.  Again on 1 July 1955, the Bjerkaker area of Tromsøysund (population: 1,583) was transferred to the city of Tromsø.

During the 1960s, there were many municipal mergers across Norway due to the work of the Schei Committee.  On 1 January 1964, a major municipal merger took place.  All of Tromsøysund municipality (population: 16,727) was merged with the city of Tromsø (population: 12,602), the parts of Hillesøy municipality on Kvaløya island (population: 1,316), and most (except the Svensby area) of Ullsfjord municipality (population: 2,019) to form a new, larger Tromsø Municipality.

Coat of arms
The coat of arms was granted on 9 April 1954. The official blazon is "Gules, a two-masted ship Or". This means the arms have a red field (background) and the charge is a two-masted ship. The ship has a tincture of Or which means it is commonly colored yellow, but if it is made out of metal, then gold is used. The boat symbolized the importance of the sea and fishing for the municipality. The arms were designed by Sverre Mack who was helped by Hallvard Trætteberg. This coat of arms was the first municipal coat of arms for a rural municipality in Norway (previously, arms had been used for towns and cities, but not rural locations).

Government
While it existed, this municipality was responsible for primary education (through 10th grade), outpatient health services, senior citizen services, unemployment and other social services, zoning, economic development, and municipal roads. During its existence, this municipality was governed by a municipal council of elected representatives, which in turn elected a mayor.

Municipal council
The municipal council  of Tromsøysund was made up of 53 representatives that were elected to four year terms.  The party breakdown of the final municipal council was as follows:

Mayors
The mayors of Tromsøysund:

 1838-1842: Leonhard Holmboe 
 1842-1844: Hans Kiil Larsen 
 1844-1848: Hans Simon Christoffersen 
 1848-1852: Peder Jeremias Larsen 
 1-852-1854: Hans Lokkert Nilsen 
 1854-1857: Hans A. Moursund, Jr.
 1857-1859: Hans Henrik Kjær 
 1859-1861: Hans Bergesen Holmeslett
 1861-1865: Lars Moe 
 1865-1866: Hans Bergesen Holmeslett
 1867-1875: Petter Jensen 
 1875-1876: Hans Bergesen Holmeslett 
 1877-1898: P. Chr. Nikolaisen 
 1899-1910: Hans Pedersen Berg 
 1911-1913: Hans Nilsen Finnvik 
 1914-1916: Ole M. Gausdal
 1917-1925: Iver Walnum  
 1926-1928: Anton Jakobsen 
 1929-1931: Alfred Hansen 
 1932-1934: Anton Jakobsen 
 1935-1940: Alfred Hansen 
 1941-1941: Otto Hj. Munthe-Kaas 
 1941-1943: Theodor Hansen 
 1943-1944: Einar W. Nilsen 
 1944-1944: Fritz Posti 
 1945-1945: Johan Smith Meyer 
 1945-1948: Alfred Hansen
 1948-1961: Kåre Martin Hansen
 1962-1963: Kåre Nordgård

See also
List of former municipalities of Norway

References

External links

Tromsø
Former municipalities of Norway
1838 establishments in Norway
1964 disestablishments in Norway